Countess Georgina von Wilczek (24 October 1921 – 18 October 1989) was Princess of Liechtenstein from 1943 to 1989 as the wife of Prince Franz Joseph II. She was the mother of Prince Hans-Adam II and was widely known as Gina.

Biography
Princess Georgina was born on 24 October 1921, in Graz, Austria. She was the daughter of Count Ferdinand von Wilczek (1893-1977) and Countess Norbertine "Nora" Kinsky von Wchinitz und Tettau (1888-1923). In 1923, when Georgina was just two years old, her mother died after giving birth to a stillborn child.

Princess Gina received her formal education in the Sacre Coeur grammar school and a boarding school run by the Congregation of Jesus in Rome. She 
then studied languages at the University of Vienna and graduated as an interpreter in English, French and Italian.

Georgina probably met her future husband, Prince Franz Joseph II, in early 1942. He was also her third cousin, and he had been the reigning Prince of Liechtenstein since 1938. They had an age difference of 15 years, and their friendship eventually turned to love. Their engagement was announced on 30 December 1942. They were married on 7 March 1943 at the Cathedral of St. Florin in Vaduz. It was the first time that the wedding of a ruling Prince had taken place in Liechtenstein. During the following weeks, the newlyweds visited all eleven communes of Liechtenstein.

The couple had five children:

 Hans-Adam II, Prince of Liechtenstein (born 1945). Married Countess Marie Kinsky of Wchinitz and Tettau and has issue.
 Prince Philipp of Liechtenstein (born 1946). Married Isabelle de l'Arbre de Malander (b. 1949) and has issue.
 Prince Nikolaus of Liechtenstein (born 1947). Married Princess Margaretha of Luxembourg (b. 1957), daughter of Grand Duke Jean, and has issue.
 Princess Norberta of Liechtenstein (born 1950), popularly known as Princess Nora. Married Vicente Sartorius y Cabeza de Vaca, 3rd Marquis of Mariño, and has issue.
 Prince Franz Josef of Liechtenstein (Zürich, 19 November 1962 – Vaduz, 28 February 1991), popularly known as Prince Wenzel.

During World War II, Princess Georgina had concerns for prisoners of war and travelling by bicycle when the country suffered a gasoline shortage. When the war ended, Princess Georgina helped the refugees by making soup and bathing children on the national border at Schaanwald. 

On 22 June 1945, Princess Gina founded the Liechtenstein Red Cross, and was president from 1945 to 1985 and became honorary president in 1985. The following year, she founded a counseling center for mothers in Liechtenstein. In 1948, the Liechtenstein Red Cross's family welfare organization was founded. In 1956, Princess Gina opened the Red Cross's first children's home in Triesen. In 1972, the Red Cross's rescue service was established.

In 1976, Princess Gina's father permitted the publication titled Russisches Tagebuch: 1916-1918 (English: Russian Diaries: 1916–1918) about his late wife's diaries written during her time in Siberia. She contributed the foreword to the publication.

She supported Vereine für Familienhilfe since 1956. She was also a president of Verband Liechtensteinischer Familienhilfen, a family support organisation, from 1966 to 1977 and a patron from 1977 to 1989. In 1989, she became honorary president of the International Council of Homehelp-Service. She became president of Association for Curative Education in Liechtenstein (German: Verein für Heilpädagogische Hilfe) from 1967-83. Under her leadership, a school for disabled children and a protective workshops were founded in 1969 and 1975 respectively. She also founded the Liechtenstein Foundation for Old Age (German: Liechtenstein Stiftung für das Alter) in 1971 where she became the president of the board of trustees. She became the head of the Martin Tietz Foundation. 

In 1966, Association of Liechtenstein Female Farmers was founded on the initiative of Princess Gina with the support of the Liechtenstein Farmers' Association. She was appointed as a honorary president. She was the patron of the Liechtenstein Girl Scouts and often attended their events. 

Beside from her numerous charitable and social activities, Princess Gina was also committed to a number of political issues including the introduction of women's suffrage in Liechtenstein. In 1987, the Princess was awarded the Henry Dunant Medal by the International Committee of the Red Cross. Princess Gina was very popular with the public for her social commitment to families, the disabled, the elderly and refugees, being a caring mother, as well as her warm and open personality.

Princess Georgina died on 18 October 1989, in the Cantonal Hospital in Grabs, Switzerland, six days before her 68th birthday shortly after receiving her last sacraments. She had been hospitalized for an undisclosed illness leading up to her death. Her husband, who was also in poor health, collapsed at her bed and died 26 days later. They are interred together in Vaduz Cathedral.

Princess Gina Trail was named in her honour. Fürst Franz und Fürstin Gina Pfadfinder was founded in honour of Prince Franz Josef II and Princess Gina. Two of her descendants were named after her: her great-grandaughters Princess Georgina "Gina" Maximiliana Tatiana Maria of Liechtenstein (b. 2005, daughter of Prince Constantin) and Althaea Georgina Worthington (b. 2022, granddaughter of Prince Nikolaus through his second daughter Princess Marie-Astrid).

Titles, styles and honours

Titles and styles
24 October 1921 – 7 March 1943: Countess Georgina von Wilczek
7 March 1943 – 18 October 1989: Her Serene Highness The Princess of Liechtenstein

Honours

National honours

 : Knight Grand Cross of the Order of Merit of the Principality of Liechtenstein, Grand Star
 : Recipient of the 50th Birthday Medal of Prince Franz Joseph II
 : Recipient of the 70th Birthday Medal of Prince Franz Joseph II

Foreign honours
  Austrian Imperial and Royal Family: Dame of the Order of the Starry Cross, 1st Class
  Greek Royal Family: Dame Grand Cross of the Royal Order of Saints Olga and Sophia
  Greek Royal Family: Dame Grand Cross of the Royal Order of Beneficence
 : Dame Grand Cross of the Order of the Holy Sepulchre
 : Recipient of the Pro Ecclesia et Pontifice
  Iranian Imperial Family: Recipient of the Commemorative Medal of the 2,500-year Celebration of the Persian Empire

Ancestry

References

External links
Gina's biography on the Princely House's website

|-

1921 births
1989 deaths
Princely consorts of Liechtenstein
Georgina
Royal consorts
Austrian nobility
Austrian countesses
Grand Crosses of the Order of Beneficence (Greece)
Members of the Order of the Holy Sepulchre
Austrian Roman Catholics
Liechtenstein Roman Catholics
20th-century Roman Catholics
21st-century Roman Catholics
People from Graz
People from Styria
Austrian people of German descent
Liechtenstein people of Austrian descent
Austrian people of Czech descent
20th-century Austrian women
20th-century Liechtenstein women
20th-century Liechtenstein people